Flavimarina pacifica is a Gram-negative, facultatively anaerobic and rod-shaped bacterium from the genus of Flavimarina which has been isolated from seawater.

References 

Flavobacteria
Bacteria described in 2015